Habrosyne gloriosa, the glorious habrosyne moth, is a moth in the family Drepanidae. It is found in North America, where it has been recorded from the northern United States, south in the Rocky Mountains to Arizona. In Canada, it is found in Ontario and Quebec.

The wingspan is about 37 mm. Adults are very similar to Habrosyne scripta, but the antemedian line has a sharp angle near the middle. Adults are on wing from April to September in two generations per year.

The larvae feed on Rubus species.

References

Moths described in 1852
Thyatirinae